Horné Plachtince is a village and municipality in the Veľký Krtíš District of the Banská Bystrica Region of southern Slovakia.

History
In historical records, the village was first mentioned in 1243 (1243 Palahta, Palojtha, 1245 Palahta, Plahta, 1337 Palahta Superior). It belonged to nobles Doboy, Daszcoy and Simonfy. In 1685 it was pillaged by Turks. In 1776 it passed to ecclesiastical Rožňava’s Capitol.

Famous people
Milan Kňažko, actor and politician

Genealogical resources

The records for genealogical research are available at the state archive "Statny Archiv in Banska Bystrica, Slovakia"

 Roman Catholic church records (births/marriages/deaths): 1689-1900 (parish B)
 Lutheran church records (births/marriages/deaths): 1731-1939 (parish B)

See also
 List of municipalities and towns in Slovakia

References

External links
 
http://www.e-obce.sk/obec/horneplachtince/horne-plachtince.html
http://www.vychodnyhont.szm.sk/hplachtince.html
Surnames of living people in Horne Plachtince

Villages and municipalities in Veľký Krtíš District